The CORONA program was a series of American strategic reconnaissance satellites produced and operated by the Central Intelligence Agency (CIA) Directorate of Science & Technology with substantial assistance from the U.S. Air Force. The CORONA satellites were used for photographic surveillance of the Soviet Union (USSR), China, and other areas beginning in June 1959 and ending in May 1972.

History 
In 1957, the Soviet Union launched Sputnik 1, the first artificial Earth satellite. Officially, Sputnik was launched to correspond with the International Geophysical Year, a solar period that the International Council of Scientific Unions declared would be ideal for the launching of artificial satellites to study Earth and the solar system. However, the launch led to public concern about the perceived technological gap between the West and the Soviet Union. The unanticipated success of the mission precipitated the Sputnik Crisis, and prompted President Dwight D. Eisenhower to authorize the Corona program, a top priority reconnaissance program managed jointly by the Air Force and the CIA. Satellites were developed to photograph denied areas from space, provide information about Soviet missile capability and replace risky U-2 reconnaissance flights over Soviet territory.

Overview 

CORONA started under the name "Discoverer" as part of the WS-117L satellite reconnaissance and protection program of the U.S. Air Force in 1956. The WS-117L was based on recommendations and designs from the RAND Corporation. The primary goal of the program was to develop a film-return photographic satellite to replace the U-2 spyplane in surveilling the Sino-Soviet Bloc, determining the disposition and speed of production of Soviet missiles and long-range bombers assets. The CORONA program was also used to produce maps and charts for the Department of Defense and other U.S. government mapping programs.

The CORONA project was pushed forward rapidly following the shooting down of a U-2 spy plane over the Soviet Union on 1 May 1960.

CORONA ultimately encompassed eight separate but overlapping series of satellites (dubbed "Keyhole" or KH ), launched from 1959 to 1972. CORONA was complemented and ultimately succeeded by the higher resolution KH-7 Gambit and KH-8 Gambit 3 series of satellites.

An alternative concurrent program to the CORONA program was SAMOS. That program included several types of satellite which used a different photographic method. This involved capturing an image on photographic film, developing the film aboard the satellite and then scanning the image electronically. The image was then transmitted via telemetry to ground stations. The Samos E-1 and Samos E-2 satellite programs used this system, but they were not able to take very many pictures and then relay them to the ground stations each day. Two later versions of the Samos program, such as the E-5 and the E-6, used the bucket-return approach pioneered with CORONA, but neither of the latter Samos series were successful.

Spacecraft 
The CORONA satellites were designated KH-1, KH-2, KH-3, KH-4, KH-4A and KH-4B. KH stood for "Key Hole" or "Keyhole" (Code number 1010), with the name being an analogy to the act of spying into a person's room by peering through their door's keyhole. The incrementing number indicated changes in the surveillance instrumentation, such as the change from single-panoramic to double-panoramic cameras. The "KH" naming system was first used in 1962 with KH-4, the earlier numbers being applied retroactively.

Below is a list of CORONA launches, as compiled by the United States Geological Survey. This table lists government's designation of each type of satellite (C, C-prime, J-1, etc.), the resolution of the camera, and a description of the camera system.

*(The stray "quote marks" are part of the original designations of the first three generations of cameras.)

Program history

Discoverer 
As American space launches were not classified until late 1961, the first CORONA satellites were cloaked with disinformation as being part of a space technology development program called Discoverer. To the public, Discoverer missions were scientific and engineering missions, the film-return capsules being used to return biological specimens. To facilitate this deception, several CORONA capsules were built to house a monkey passenger. Many test monkeys were lost during ground tests of the capsule's life support system. The Discoverer cover proved to be cumbersome, inviting scrutiny from the scientific community. Discoverer 37, launched 13 January 1962, was the last CORONA mission to bear the Discoverer name. Subsequent CORONA missions were simply classified as "Department of Defense satellite launches".

KH-1 
The first series of CORONA satellites were the Keyhole 1 (KH-1) satellites based on the Agena-A upper stage, which offered housing and an engine that provided attitude control in orbit. The KH-1 payload included the C (for CORONA) single panoramic camera built by Fairchild Camera and Instrument with a f/5.0 aperture and  focal length. Film was returned from orbit by a single General Electric Satellite Return Vehicle (SRV). The SRV was equipped with a small onboard solid-fuel retro motor to deorbit the payload at the end of the mission. Recovery of the capsule was done in mid-air by a specially equipped aircraft.

There were three camera-less test launches in the first half of 1959, none of them entirely successful. Discoverer 1 was a test vehicle carrying no SRV nor camera. Launched on 28 February 1959, it was the first man-made object put into a polar orbit, but only sporadically returned telemetry. Discoverer 2 (14 April 1959) carried a recovery capsule for the first time but no camera. The main bus performed well, but the capsule recovery failed, the SRV coming down over Spitzbergen rather than Hawaii. The capsule was never found. Discoverer 3 (3 June 1959), the first Discoverer to carry a biological package (four black mice in this case) failed to achieve orbit when its Agena crashed into the Pacific Ocean.

The pressure to orbit a photographic surveillance satellite to succeed the Lockheed U-2 was so great that operational, camera-equipped KH-1 launches began 25 June 1959 with the (unsuccessful) launching of Discoverer 4, despite there not having been a successful test of the life-support unit for biological passengers. This proved to be a moot point by this time as the link between the Discoverer series and living payloads had been established by the attempted flight of Discoverer 3.

The three subsequent Discoverers were successfully orbited, but all of their cameras failed when the film snapped during loading. Ground tests determined that the acetate-based film became brittle in the vacuum of space, something that had not been discovered even in high altitude, low pressure testing. The Eastman Kodak Company was tasked with creating a more resilient replacement. Kodak developed a technique of coating a high-resolution emulsion on a type of polyester from DuPont. Not only was the resulting polyester-based film resistant to vacuum brittling, it weighed half as much as the prior acetate-based film.

There were four more partially successful and unsuccessful missions in the KH-1 series before Discoverer 13 (10 August 1960), which managed a fully successful capsule recovery for the first time. This was the first recovery of a man-made object from space, beating the Soviet Korabl Sputnik 2 by nine days. Discoverer 13 is now on display in the "Milestones of Flight" hall in the National Air and Space Museum in Washington, D.C.

Two days after the 18 August 1960 launch of Discoverer 14, its film bucket was successfully retrieved in the Pacific Ocean by a Fairchild C-119 Flying Boxcar transport plane. This was the first successful return of a payload from orbit, occurring just one day before the launch of Korabl-Sputnik 2, a biosatellite that took into orbit the two Soviet space dogs, Belka and Strelka, and safely returned them to Earth.

The impact of CORONA on American intelligence gathering was tremendous. With the success of Discoverer 14, which returned  of film and provided more coverage of the Soviet Union than all preceding U2 flights, for the first time the United States had a clear picture of the USSR's strategic nuclear capabilities. Before CORONA, the National Intelligence Estimates (NIE) of CIA were highly uncertain and strongly debated. Six months before Discoverer 14, an NIE predicted that the Soviets would have 140–200 ICBMs deployed by 1961. A month after the flight of Discoverer 14, that estimate was refined to just 10–25.

Additionally, CORONA increased the pace at which intelligence could be received, with satellites providing monthly coverage from the start. Photographs were more easily assessed by analysts and political leaders than covert agent reports, improving not just the amount of intelligence but its accessibility.

The KH-1 series ended with Discoverer 15 (13 September 1960), whose capsule successfully deorbited but sank into the Pacific Ocean and was not recovered.

Later KH Series 
In 1963, the KH-4 system was introduced with dual cameras and the program made completely secret by then president, John Kennedy. The Discoverer label was dropped and all launches became classified. Because of the increased satellite mass, the basic Thor-Agena vehicle’s capabilities were augmented by the addition of three Castor solid-fueled strap-on motors. On 28 February 1963, the first Thrust Augmented Thor lifted from Vandenberg Air Force Base at Launch Complex 75 carrying the first KH-4 satellite. The launch of the new and unproven booster went awry as one SRB failed to ignite. Eventually the dead weight of the strap-on motor dragged the Thor off its flight path, leading to a Range Safety destruct. It was suspected that a technician had not attached an umbilical on the SRB properly. Although some failures continued to occur during the next few years, the reliability rate of the program significantly improved with KH-4. Maneuvering rockets were also added to the satellite beginning in 1963. These were different from the attitude stabilizing thrusters which had been incorporated from the beginning of the program. CORONA orbited in very low orbits to enhance resolution of its camera system. But at perigee (the lowest point in the orbit), CORONA endured drag from the atmosphere of Earth. In time, this could cause its orbit to decay and force the satellite to re-enter the atmosphere prematurely. The new maneuvering rockets were designed to boost CORONA into a higher orbit, and lengthen the mission time even if low perigees were used. For use during unexpected crises, the National Reconnaissance Office (NRO) kept a CORONA in "R-7" status, meaning ready for launch in seven days. By the summer of 1965, NRO was able to maintain CORONA for launch within one day.

Nine of the KH-4A and KH-4B missions included ELINT subsatellites, which were launched into a higher orbit.

Some P-11 reconnaissance satellites were launched from KH-4A.

At least two launches of Discoverer were used to test satellites for the Missile Defense Alarm System (MIDAS), an early missile-launch-detection program that used infrared cameras to detect the heat signature of launch vehicles launching to orbit.

The last launch under the Discoverer cover name was Discoverer 38 on 26 February 1962. Its bucket was successfully recovered in midair during the 65th orbit (the 13th recovery of a bucket; the ninth one in midair). Following this last use of the Discoverer name, the remaining launches of CORONA satellites were entirely TOP SECRET. The last CORONA launch was on 25 May 1972. The project ended when CORONA was replaced by the KH-9 Hexagon program.

Technology

Cameras 
The CORONA satellites used special 70 mm film with a  focal length camera. The contrast was 2-to-1. (By comparison, the best aerial photography film produced in World War II could produce just 50 lines per mm (1250 per inch) of film). The acetate-based film was later replaced with a polyester-based film stock that was more durable in Earth orbit. The amount of film carried by the satellites varied over time. But a reduction in the thickness of the film stock allowed more film to be carried. This was accomplished by a reduction in film thickness and with additional film capsules. Most of the film shot was black and white. Infrared film was used on mission 1104, and color film on missions 1105 and 1008. Color film proved to have lower resolution, and so was never used again.

The cameras were manufactured by the Itek Corporation. A , f/5 triplet lens was designed for the cameras. They were quite similar to the Tessar lenses developed in Germany by Carl Zeiss AG. Beginning with the KH-4 satellites, these lenses were replaced with Petzval f/3.5 lens. The lenses were panoramic, and moved through a 70° arc perpendicular to the direction of the orbit. A panoramic lens was chosen because it could obtain a wider image. Although the best resolution was only obtained in the center of the image, this could be overcome by having the camera sweep automatically ("reciprocate") back and forth across 70° of arc. The lens on the camera was constantly rotating, to counteract the blurring effect of the satellite moving over the planet.

The first CORONA satellites had a single camera, but a two-camera system was quickly implemented. The front camera was tilted 15° aft, and the rear camera tilted 15° forward, so that a stereoscopic image could be obtained. Later in the program, the satellite employed three cameras. The third camera was employed to take "index" photographs of the objects being stereographically filmed. The J-3 camera system, first deployed in 1967, placed the camera in a drum. This "rotator camera" (or drum) moved back and forth, eliminating the need to move the camera itself on a reciprocating mechanism. The drum permitted the use of up to two filters and as many as four different exposure slits, greatly improving the variability of images that CORONA could take. Improvements in the imaging system were rapid, and the KH-3 missions could see objects  in diameter. Later missions would be able to resolve objects just  in diameter.  resolution was found to be the optimum resolution for quality of image and field of view.

The initial CORONA missions suffered from mysterious border fogging and bright streaks which appeared irregularly on the returned film. Eventually, a team of scientists and engineers from the project and from academia (among them Luis Alvarez, Sidney Beldner, Malvin Ruderman, Arthur Glines, and Sidney Drell) determined that electrostatic discharges (called corona discharges) caused by some of the components of the cameras were exposing the film. Corrective measures included better grounding of the components, improved film rollers that did not generate static electricity, improved temperature controls, and a cleaner internal environment. Although improvements were made to reduce the corona, the final solution was to load the film canisters with a full load of film and then feed the unexposed film through the camera onto the take-up reel with no exposure. This unexposed film was then processed and inspected for corona. If none was found or the corona observed was within acceptable levels, the canisters were certified for use and loaded with fresh film for a launch mission.

Calibration 
CORONA satellites were allegedly calibrated using the calibration targets located outside of Casa Grande, Arizona. The targets consisted of concrete arrows located in and to the south of the city, and may have helped to calibrate the cameras of the satellites. These claims about the purpose of the targets, perpetuated by online forums and featured in National Geographic and NPR articles, have since been disputed, with aerial photogrammetry proposed as a more likely purpose for them.

Recovery 

Film was retrieved from orbit via a reentry capsule (nicknamed "film bucket"), designed by General Electric, which separated from the satellite and fell to Earth. The capsule was intended to be caught in mid-air by a passing airplane towing an airborne claw which would then winch it aboard, or it could land at sea. A salt plug in the base would dissolve after two days, allowing the capsule to sink if it was not picked up by the United States Navy. After Reuters reported on a reentry vehicle's accidental landing and discovery by Venezuelan farmers in mid-1964, capsules were no longer labeled "SECRET" but offered a reward in eight languages for aerial footage return to the United States. Beginning with flight number 69, a two-capsule system was employed. This also allowed the satellite to go into passive (or "zombie") mode, shutting down for as many as 21 days before taking images again. Beginning in 1963, another improvement was "Lifeboat", a battery-powered system that allowed for ejection and recovery of the capsule in case power failed. The film was processed at Eastman Kodak's Hawkeye facility in Rochester, New York.

The CORONA film bucket was later adapted for the KH-7 GAMBIT satellites, which took higher resolution photos.

Launch 
CORONA were launched by a Thor-Agena rocket, which used a Thor first stage and an Agena as the second stage of the rocket lifting the CORONA into orbit.

Originally, CORONA satellites were designed to spin along their main axis so that the satellite would remain stable. Cameras would take photographs only when pointed at the Earth. The Itek camera company, however, proposed to stabilize the satellite along all three axes—keeping the cameras permanently pointed at the earth. Beginning with the KH-3 version of the satellite, a horizon camera took images of several key stars. A sensor used the satellite's side thruster rockets to align the rocket with these "index stars", so that it was correctly aligned with the Earth and the cameras pointed in the right direction. Beginning in 1967, two horizon cameras were used. This system was known as the Dual Improved Stellar Index Camera (DISIC).

Operations 
The United States Air Force credits the Sunnyvale Air Force Station (now Onizuka Air Force Station) as being the "birthplace of the CORONA program". In May 1958, the Department of Defense directed the transfer of the WS-117L program to Advanced Research Projects Agency (ARPA). In FY1958, WS-117L was funded by the USAF at a level of US$108.2 million (inflation adjusted US$ billion in ). For DISCOVERER, the Air Force and ARPA spent a combined sum of US$132.3 million in FY1959 (inflation adjusted US$ billion in ) and US$101.2 million in FY1960 (inflation adjusted US$ billion in ). According to John N. McMahon, the total cost of the CORONA program amounted to $US850 million.

The procurement and maintenance of the CORONA satellites were managed by the Central Intelligence Agency (CIA), which used cover arrangements lasting from April 1958 to 1969 to get access to the Palo Alto plant of the Hiller Helicopter Corporation for the production. At this facility, the rocket's second stage Agena, the cameras, film cassettes, and re-entry capsule were assembled and tested before shipment to Vandenberg Air Force Base. In 1969, assembly duties were relocated to the Lockheed facilities in Sunnyvale, California. (The NRO was worried that, as CORONA was phased out, skilled technicians worried about their jobs would quit the program—leaving CORONA without staff. The move to Sunnyvale ensured that enough skilled staff would be available.)

The decisions regarding what to photograph were made by the CORONA Target Program. CORONA satellites were placed into near-polar orbits. This software, run by an on-board computer, was programmed to operate the cameras based on the intelligence targets to be imaged, the weather, the satellite's operational status, and what images the cameras had already captured. Ground control for CORONA satellites was initially conducted from Stanford Industrial Park, an industrial park on Page Mill Road in Palo Alto, California. It was later moved to Sunnyvale Air Force Base near Sunnyvale, California.

Design staff 
For their role in creating the first space-based Earth photographic observation systems, they were awarded the Charles Stark Draper Prize in 2005.

Declassification 
The CORONA program was officially classified top secret until 1992. On 22 February 1995, the photos taken by the CORONA satellites, and also by two contemporary programs (ARGON and KH-6 LANYARD) were declassified under an Executive Order signed by President Bill Clinton. The further review by photo experts of the "obsolete broad-area film-return systems other than CORONA" mandated by President Clinton's order led to the declassification in 2002 of the photos from the KH-7 and the KH-9 low-resolution cameras.

The declassified imagery has since been used by a team of scientists from the Australian National University to locate and explore ancient habitation sites, pottery factories, megalithic tombs, and Palaeolithic archaeological remains in northern Syria. Similarly, scientists at Harvard have used the imagery to identify prehistoric traveling routes in Mesopotamia.

The U.S. Geological Survey hosts more than 860,000 images of the Earth’s surface from between 1960 and 1972 from CORONA, ARGON, and LANYARD programs.

Launches

Image gallery

In popular culture 
The 1963 thriller novel Ice Station Zebra and its 1968 film adaptation were inspired, in part, by news accounts from 17 April 1959, about a missing experimental CORONA satellite capsule (Discoverer 2) that inadvertently landed near Spitzbergen on 13 April 1959. While Soviet agents may have recovered the vehicle, it is more likely that the capsule landed in water and sank.

See also 

 Cold War
 Deep Black (1986 book)
 KH-5 ARGON, KH-6 LANYARD, KH-7 GAMBIT, KH-8 GAMBIT 3
 KH-9 Hexagon "Big Bird"
 KH-10 DORIAN or Manned Orbital Laboratory (MOL program)
 KH-11, KH-12, KH-13.
 Richard M. Bissell Jr.
 SAMOS
 Satellite imagery
 Zenit

References

Sources 
 Burrows, William E., This New Ocean: The Story of the First Space Age, New York, Random House, 1998 
 Chun, Clayton K.S., Thunder Over the Horizon: From V-2 rockets to Ballistic Missiles, Westport, Praeger Security International, 2006 
 Collins, Martin, After Sputnik: 50 Years of the Space Age, New York, Smithsonian Books/HarperCollins, 2007 
 "Corona", Mission and Spacecraft Library, Jet Propulsion Laboratory, National Aeronautics and Space Administration, No date Accessed 2012-60-06
 Day, Dwayen A.; Logsdon, John M.; and Latell, Brian, eds. Eye in the Sky: The Story of the Corona Spy Satellites, Washington, D.C., Smithsonian Institution Press, 1998 
 
 Drell, Sidney D., "Physics and U.S. National Security", Reviews of Modern Physics, 71:2 (1999), pp. S460–S470
 Drell, Sidney D., "Reminiscences of Work on National Reconnaissance", in Nuclear Weapons, Scientists, and the Post-Cold War Challenge: Selected Papers on Arms Control, Sidney D. Drell, ed. Hackensack, New Jersey, World Scientific, 2007
 Jensen, John R., Remote Sensing of the Environment: An Earth Resource Perspective, Upper Saddle River, New Jersey, Pearson Prentice Hall, 2007 
 Kramer, Herbert J., Observation of the Earth and Its Environment: Survey of Missions and Sensors, Berlin, Springer, 2002 
 Lewis, Jonathan E., Spy Capitalism: Itek and the CIA, New Haven, Connecticut, Yale University Press, 2002 
 Monmonier, Mark S., Spying With Maps: Surveillance Technologies and the Future of Privacy, Chicago, Illinois, University of Chicago Press, 2004 
 National Aeronautics and Space Administration, Societal Impact of Spaceflight, Washington, D.C., NASA, 2009
 Olsen, Richard C., Remote Sensing From Air and Space. Bellingham, Washington, SPIE Press, 2007
 Peebles, Curtis, The Corona Project: America's First Spy Satellites, Annapolis, Maryland, Naval Institute Press, 1997 
 Ruffner, Kevin C., ed. Corona: America's First Satellite Program, New York, Morgan James, 1995 
 Smith, F. Dow, "The Design and Engineering of Corona's Optics", in CORONA: Between the Sun and the Earth: The First NRO Reconnaissance Eye in Space, Robert McDonald, ed. Bethesda, Maryland: ASPRS, 1997
 Taubman, Phil, Secret Empire: Eisenhower, the CIA, and the Hidden Story of America's Space Espionage, New York, Simon & Schuster, 2003. 
 Yenne, Bill, Secret Gadgets and Strange Gizmos: High-Tech (and Low-Tech) Innovations of the U.S. Military, Grand Rapids, Michigan, Publishers Group Worldwide, 2006

External links 

 US Geological Survey Satellite Images: Photographic imagery from the CORONA, ARGON and LANYARD satellites (1959 to 1972).
 GlobalSecurity.org: Imagery Intelligence
 
 Swords into Ploughshares: Archaeological Applications of CORONA Satellite Imagery in the Near East

1959 in spaceflight
1960 in spaceflight
1961 in spaceflight
1962 in spaceflight
1971 in spaceflight
1972 in spaceflight
Articles containing video clips
Lockheed Corporation
Military equipment introduced in the 1950s
Military space program of the United States
National Reconnaissance Office
Reconnaissance satellites of the United States
Satellite series
Satellites formerly orbiting Earth

de:Keyhole